The Beaver Dam Mountains Wilderness is a wilderness area located in northwestern Arizona and southwestern Utah, USA, within the arid Colorado Plateau region. The jagged mountains and gently sloping alluvial plain of the Beaver Dam Mountains straddle the border between the two states. The Wilderness contains some of the lowest elevation land in Utah, and includes a  section of the Virgin River Gorge. The area was designated Wilderness by the U.S. Congress in 1984 and is administered by the Bureau of Land Management.

The Mojave Desert landscape of the Beaver Dam Mountains features multitudes of Joshua trees (Yucca brevifolia). Notable wildlife include desert bighorn sheep, the threatened desert tortoise, and large numbers of raptors. South of Beaver Dam lies the Paiute Wilderness, on the other side of the Interstate 15 corridor and lying partially inside Grand Canyon-Parashant National Monument.

See also 
 Arizona Strip
 List of Arizona Wilderness Areas
 List of U.S. Wilderness Areas
 National Wilderness Preservation System
 Beaver Dam Wash
 Wilderness Act

References

Other sources
 Lynna P. Howard, Utah's Wilderness Areas: The Complete Guide (Westcliffe Publishers, 2005) 
 Bill Cunningham & Polly Burke, Wild Utah: A Guide to 45 Roadless Recreation Areas (Falcon Publishing, 1998)

External links 
 Wilderness.net: Beaver Dam Mountains Wilderness
 BLM Arizona: Beaver Dam Mountains Wilderness
 The American Southwest: Beaver Dam Mountains Wilderness

Wilderness areas of Arizona
Wilderness areas of Utah
Protected areas of Mohave County, Arizona
Protected areas of Washington County, Utah
Protected areas of the Mojave Desert
Bureau of Land Management areas in Utah
Bureau of Land Management areas in Arizona
Colorado Plateau